Plamen Kolev (born 9 February 1988) is a Bulgarian footballer who plays as a goalkeeper for OFC Nesebar.

Career
Plamen Kolev made his first team debut for Beroe in a 6–0 win over Chernomorets Burgas Sofia on 19 May 2007, coming on as a substitute for Daniel Bekono. During his three years in Beroe he played in 16 matches.

He subsequently spent six months as the second-choice goalkeeper at Minyor Pernik, behind Ivaylo Ivanov, and failed to make a single appearance for the team in the league.

Kolev joined Cherno More Varna on 27 December 2011.

On 2 July 2018, Kolev signed with Botev Galabovo.

Statistics 
All stats correct as of 16 December 2012.

References

External links
 
 

1988 births
Living people
Sportspeople from Stara Zagora
Bulgarian footballers
First Professional Football League (Bulgaria) players
Second Professional Football League (Bulgaria) players
PFC Beroe Stara Zagora players
PFC Minyor Pernik players
PFC Chernomorets Burgas players
FC Pomorie players
PFC Vidima-Rakovski Sevlievo players
PFC Cherno More Varna players
FC Vereya players
Neftochimic Burgas players
FC Bansko players
FC Lokomotiv Gorna Oryahovitsa players
FC Botev Galabovo players
FC Sozopol players
Association football goalkeepers